The moon-toothed degu (Octodon lunatus) is a species of rodent in the family Octodontidae. It is endemic to Chile, occurring in mountainous areas along the Pacific coast in the central part of the country.

Biology and physiology
Unlike its close relative the common degu, the moon-toothed degu is nocturnal (active at night). The ventral fur of this species has been found to be much less reflective of UV light than other octodontids, most likely as a result of its nocturnal habits.

The moon-toothed degu has deep molar indentations but lacks a fold on the inside of the last molar.

Habitat
The species is less widely distributed in Chile than the common degu and inhabits dense scrubland near the coast. Habitat ranges from sea level to 1,200 m in the Andes.

References

External links

Octodon
Mammals of Chile
Mammals described in 1943
Taxonomy articles created by Polbot
Endemic fauna of Chile